Kalati Bhumidanda is a town and municipality in Kabhrepalanchok District in the Bagmati Zone of central Nepal. At the time of the 1991 Nepal census it had a population of 3,801.

References

External links
UN map of the municipalities of Kavrepalanchowk District

Populated places in Kavrepalanchok District